Sebastian John Guzzardo Sr. (March 25, 1923 – November 26, 2021), known as Buster Guzzardo, was an American politician from the state of Louisiana. He served in the Louisiana House of Representatives from the 72nd district from 1987 to 1996. He was a veteran of World War II, serving in the United States Army as a military police officer from 1943 to 1945. In 1996, Guzzardo was indicted on 11 federal charges of obstructing law enforcement, extortion, conspiracy, conducting an illegal gambling business, aiding racketeering and mail fraud relating to a video poker investigation. He later served 21 months in prison.

Guzzardo died on November 26, 2021, at the age of 98.

References

1923 births
2021 deaths
Democratic Party members of the Louisiana House of Representatives
United States Army personnel of World War II
People from Tangipahoa Parish, Louisiana